Thomas Turner à Beckett (13 September 1808 – 1 July 1892) was a lawyer and politician in colonial Victoria (Australia), member of the Victorian Legislative Council.

Early life
à Beckett was born in London, England, son of William à Beckett (senior) and his wife Sarah, née Abbott. Thomas junior was brother of Sir William à Beckett and Gilbert Abbott à Beckett. Thomas was educated at Westminster School. In 1829 he joined his father in practice as a solicitor. Before leaving London, Thomas a'Beckett published "Remarks on the Present State of the Law of Debtor and Creditor", 1844; "Railway Litigation, and How to Check It", 1846; "Law-reforming Difficulties: a Letter to Lord Brougham", 1849.

Career in Australia
à Beckett migrated to Victoria, Australia, in 1850 and was called to the Victorian Bar a year later. From 14 July 1852 to March 1856 he was a nominee member of the unicameral Victorian Legislative Council, replacing James Ross. In October 1858 à Beckett was elected to the Central Province of the new Council (since 1856 the upper house of the Victorian parliament). This was a seat he held until August 1878.

à Beckett was in office twice when he was a Minister without portfolio from 1860 to 1861 and the Commissioner for Trade and Customs 1870 until 1871. In 1870 he was chairman of the Royal Commission on the civil service. Between 1854 and 1887 Beckett was the Registrar of the Anglican Diocese of Melbourne as well as for a part of this time becoming a member of the University Council and he became the trustee of the Public Library.

Publications
à Beckett published "A Comparative View of Court Fees and Attorneys' Charges", 1854; "A Defence of State Aid to Religion", 1856; "State Aid Question—Strictures on Pamphlets of Dr. Cairns", 1856. Mr. a'Beckett from time to time delivered lectures at the Industrial and Technological Museum, Melbourne. Several of these, including "Painting and Painters," have been published.

Late life
à Beckett retired from the Legislative Council in August 1878 and from all public duties in 1887, at the age of 79 years. He died in Brighton, Victoria, on 1 July 1892. His eldest son, Thomas à Beckett, was also a solicitor; later a judge.

See also
 Charles Henry Chomley

References 

 Australian Encyclopædia (1912 - third edition revised 1927) published by Angus & Robertson Limited, 89 Castlereagh Street, Sydney New South Wales (page 1)

1808 births
1892 deaths
Members of the Victorian Legislative Council
Australian solicitors
English emigrants to colonial Australia
Burials in Victoria (Australia)
19th-century Australian politicians
Settlers of Melbourne
Lawyers from London